Philotrox is an extinct monospecific genus of the Hesperocyoninae subfamily of early canids native to North America. In form, it was intermediate between the small Cynodesmus and the later Enhydrocyon, the first hypercarnivorous, "bone-cracking", canid.

References

Wang, X. 1994. Phylogenetic systematics of the Hesperocyoninae (Carnivora, Canidae). Bulletin of the American Museum of Natural History, 221:1-207.

Hesperocyonines
Oligocene canids
Oligocene mammals of North America
Prehistoric carnivoran genera
Taxa named by John Campbell Merriam
Rupelian genus first appearances
Chattian genus extinctions